Leonard M. Thompson International Airport, formerly known as The Marsh Harbour International Airport , is an airport serving Marsh Harbour, a town in the Abaco Islands, The Bahamas. 
Marsh Harbour is a major tourist attraction. The airport offers scheduled passenger flights to Nassau and several destinations in Florida as well as regional jet flights nonstop to Atlanta, Charlotte and Miami in the U.S. In 2007 a new runway was built to allow larger, regional jets to operate from Marsh Harbour. A new airport terminal opened on 27 May 2014.

Facilities
In 2006 the old runway was converted into a taxiway after  runway has opened. The new Leonard M. Thompson International Airport terminal opened on 27 May 2014 after three years of construction.

The new terminal incorporates architectural elements that reflect culture of The Bahamas. The new 51,000-square-foot terminal has 22 counter positions, a new luggage scanning system, pilot briefing room, two restaurants, one lounge, shops, and a public parking area.

Marsh Harbour International Airport was renamed the Leonard M. Thompson International Airport on May 25, 2016. Thompson was a prominent son of Hope Town who flew bombers for the Royal Canadian Air Force during World War II.

Airlines and destinations

Passenger

Accidents and incidents

On 25 August 2001, American singer/actress  Aaliyah and eight crew members of a group that had participated in the filming of her "Rock the Boat" music video, were killed soon after their plane took off from Marsh Harbour Airport. The plane was overloaded by 700 pounds (320 kg), according to its certification.
On 13 June 2013, a SkyBahamas Airlines Saab 340B aircraft suffered substantial damage when it departed off the side of the runway while landing in heavy rain. There were no serious injuries or deaths among the 24 passengers and crew.

References

External links
 
 
 Bimini Island Air Also operates charters from any airport in Florida

Airports in the Bahamas
Abaco Islands